Spergularia rubra, the red sandspurry or red sand-spurrey, is a plant species in the family Caryophyllaceae. It is native to Europe, Asia and North Africa, and it is present on other continents, including North and South America and Australia, as an introduced species and in many areas a common weed. It grows in a wide variety of habitat types.

It is an annual or perennial herb producing a slender, glandular stem up to about 25 centimeters long. It is lined with slightly fleshy linear or threadlike leaves each under 2 centimeters long. The leaves may be tipped with hard points or spines, and they are accompanied by shiny white lance-shaped stipules. Flowers occur in the leaf axils and at the tips of the stems. They have hairy, glandular sepals and five round-oval pink petals.

References

External links
Jepson Manual Treatment
USDA Plants Profile
Flora of North America
Photo gallery

rubra
Flora of Europe
Flora of temperate Asia
Flora of the United Kingdom
Taxa named by Carl Borivoj Presl